Lâm Đồng Football Club is a Vietnamese football club based in Lâm Đồng. The club is playing its home matches at the 3,500-capacity Lâm Viên Stadium. They will play in the 2023 V.League 2 season after purchasing the spot of Saigon FC, however they will participate as Saigon due to the transfer occurring after the team registration deadline.

Honours

National competitions
Second League:
 Runners-up :  2011

Kit suppliers and shirt sponsors

Current squad

'As 2023''

Notes

Football clubs in Vietnam